Kevin McMahon (born September 21, 1953) is a musician, singer, and songwriter for the long-standing bands Lucky Pierre and Prick.

McMahon began recording with his new wave group Lucky Pierre in 1974, releasing a number of vinyl singles though 1981. Lucky Pierre initially consisted of John Guciardo on guitar, Brian Dempsey on drums, Dennis DeVito on bass and McMahon on lead vocals and guitar. In 1976, Tom Lash joined the band on bass guitar, and DeVito moved to guitar.  Tom Miller played keyboards at this time.  In 1977, Dempsey left the band and was replaced by drummer Gary Shay, and then drummer Dave Zima.  After many live shows, both Tom Miller and John Gusciardo left Cleveland for California and DeVito switched to lead guitar.  Many showcase concerts, radio broadcasts, and a few 45RPM singles followed.  Lucky Pierre continued as a four-piece outfit, sometimes augmented by horns and vocalists to perform the array of song styles McMahon was developing.  McMahon then went on hiatus until 1988, when Lucky Pierre recorded the Communiqué EP with Guciardo, Lash, Zima. Lucky Pierre disbanded again after the recording of Communiqué, but McMahon remained in contact with the band's manager, John Malm Jr.

Shortly after the release of the Nine Inch Nails album Pretty Hate Machine, Trent Reznor played keyboard for McMahon's live shows in London during November of 1989, and Reznor started his tour of Europe the following month. Prick later toured with Nine Inch Nails and David Bowie in 1995, and McMahon is still in contact with Reznor.

During the early 1990s, McMahon began his second musical project, the industrial rock band Prick.  Prick was eventually signed to Reznor's Nothing Records label.  The band's debut self-titled album was released in 1995. Prick'''s lead single, "Animal," received high rotation on MuchMusic and MTV, and Prick opened for Nine Inch Nails' and David Bowie's Outside tour World Tour. McMahon would also be a temporary member of Nine Inch Nails, playing guitar on a short tour in 1995. The band would also perform 2 Prick songs on these nights, with McMahon sharing vocals with Reznor.

Prick re-emerged in 2002 with The Wreckard, independently released by McMahon and featuring many songs once slated for the second, canceled Nothing Records album.  Two years later, McMahon released Lucky Pierre's first full album, ThinKing, again selling the album independently online.

In October 2008, McMahon released the hard-rock track "Runaway Brain," this time under the moniker ( sic ). The song was available from a fansite  for a limited time, with a note in the MP3's metadata noting, "prick or treat –  derailing things to come from luckypierremusic –  THIS NOVEMBER (or ...it all depends on the speed of green)."

On June 21, 2009, luckypierremusic.com went live, offering digital downloads, new and vintage shirts and hats, and new CDs. As alluded to previously, The Wreckard and ThinKing are being reissued, and the Fear of Blue and (sic) album and EP are also being released. All of the music can be obtained through a six-CD package which features a Prick Live CD  only available as part of the package.

Discography

Albums
Prick – Prick (1995)
Prick – The Wreckard (2002)
Lucky Pierre – ThinKing (2004)
Lucky Pierre – Lucky Pierre (2009) (compilation)
Fear of Blue – Fear of Blue (2009) (recorded in 1990)
Lucky Pierre – ThinKing (2009) (Re-release)
Prick – The Wreckard (2009) (Re-release)
Prick – Prick Boston LIVE (2009) (live album)

Singles and EPs
Lucky Pierre – "Fans & Cameras" / "Idlewood" (7" single, 1977, 1979)
Lucky Pierre – "Into My Arms" / "Match" (7in single, 1980)
Lucky Pierre – "Stetson's" / "Once A Child" (7in single, 1981)
Lucky Pierre – "Communiqué" (one-sided 7in single, 1984)
Lucky Pierre – "Cool Summer Night" / "Chilly Willy" (7" single, 1984)
Lucky Pierre – "Muchacha Latina Today" / "Birdman" (7" single, 1984)
Lucky Pierre – Communiqué (12" EP, 1988) side 1 = "Communiqué" and "Tough" side 2 = "Analyst Says," "I Need to Get to Know" and "Man Against the Wall"
Prick – "Animal" (promotional CD single, 1995)
Prick – "Communiqué" / "Crack" (promotional 7" single, 1994)
(sic) – (sic)'' (CD EP, 2009)

References

External links
Lucky Pierre Music at luckypierremusic.com (Official site)
Lucky Pierre at Discogs
Prick at Discogs
[ Prick] at Allmusic
Everything Kevin McMahon at luckyPRICK.net (Fan site)

1953 births
Living people
American male singer-songwriters
American singer-songwriters
American rock singers
American rock songwriters
American rock guitarists
American male guitarists
Alternative rock guitarists
Nothing Records artists
American industrial musicians
American new wave musicians
American multi-instrumentalists
Prick (band) members
American post-punk musicians